Darrell Kevin May (born June 13, 1972) is an American former professional baseball starting pitcher.

Career
May's professional baseball career began when the Atlanta Braves drafted him in the 46th round of the 1992 Major League Baseball Draft.

May spent parts of three seasons in the Major Leagues with the Braves, Pirates, and Angels, before being sold to the Hanshin Tigers of Japan's Central League in 1998.

May spent four seasons in Japan, two each with the Hanshin Tigers and the Yomiuri Giants. In 2001, he had his best season with 12 wins and a 2.95 ERA, and finished third in MVP balloting. Royals' General Manager Allard Baird, on a scouting trip in September 2001, was impressed by May's performance and signed him to a 1-year contract.

May struggled in 2002, but the Royals re-signed him for 2003. May responded by going 10-8 with a 3.77 ERA and leading the team in wins, ERA, innings pitched, strikeouts, complete games and games started.

Coaching career
Darrel May currently coaches high school baseball at St. Michaels Catholic Academy in Austin, Texas.

References

External links

1972 births
Living people
American expatriate baseball players in Canada
American expatriate baseball players in Japan
Anaheim Angels players
Atlanta Braves players
Baseball coaches from California
Baseball players from California
Calgary Cannons players
California Angels players
Columbus Clippers players
Durham Bulls players
Greenville Braves players
Gulf Coast Braves players
Hanshin Tigers players
High school baseball coaches in the United States
Kansas City Royals players
Louisville Bats players
Macon Braves players
Major League Baseball pitchers
New York Yankees players
Nippon Professional Baseball pitchers
Omaha Royals players
Pittsburgh Pirates players
Richmond Braves players
San Diego Padres players
Sacramento City Panthers baseball players
Sportspeople from San Bernardino, California
Vancouver Canadians players
Wichita Wranglers players
Yomiuri Giants players
Alaska Goldpanners of Fairbanks players